Lingner is a surname. People with the surname include:
Adam Lingner (born 1960), American football player
Joachim Lingner (born 1962), Swiss molecular biologist